Pherne subpunctata is a species of geometrid moth in the family Geometridae. It is found in North America.

The MONA or Hodges number for Pherne subpunctata is 6952.

References

 Scoble, Malcolm J., ed. (1999). Geometrid Moths of the World: A Catalogue (Lepidoptera, Geometridae), 1016.

Further reading

 Butterflies and Moths of North America
 

Geometridae